Adolfo José Hirsch (born 31 January 1986) is a Sammarinese footballer who plays for Folgore and the San Marino national team, as a striker. Besides San Marino, he has played in Argentina.

International career
An Argentine-born and raised player, Hirsch emigrated to San Marino in 2009. He made his international debut for San Marino on 10 August 2011, coming on as an 81st-minute substitute in a 0–1 friendly loss against Romania.

References

External links
 
 
 

1986 births
Living people
People from Pergamino Partido
Sammarinese footballers
San Marino international footballers
Argentine footballers
Argentine emigrants to San Marino
Sammarinese people of Argentine descent
Sportspeople of Argentine descent
Argentine people of Sammarinese descent
S.S. Virtus players
S.S. Folgore Falciano Calcio players
Association football forwards
Sportspeople from Buenos Aires Province